Kasper Thiesson Kristensen (born 4 August 1999) is a Danish professional footballer who plays for Trelleborgs FF, as a goalkeeper.

References

1999 births
Living people
Danish men's footballers
Aarhus Gymnastikforening players
Trelleborgs FF players
Danish Superliga players
Association football goalkeepers
Danish expatriate men's footballers
Danish expatriate sportspeople in Sweden
Expatriate footballers in Sweden
Allsvenskan players
Footballers from Aarhus